Thembela Sikhakhane (born 24 January 1993) is a South African footballer who plays for AmaZulu as a right back.

Club career
He was born in Ulundi.

Sikhakhane began his playing career with Vodacom League team Gqikazi All Stars. He joined Golden Arrows in January 2013 on a three-year deal.

References

External links

1993 births
Living people
South African soccer players
Association football fullbacks
Lamontville Golden Arrows F.C. players
Orlando Pirates F.C. players
AmaZulu F.C. players
South African Premier Division players
National First Division players
People from Ulundi Local Municipality
Soccer players from KwaZulu-Natal